The Burari deaths were a ritual mass suicide of eleven family members of the Chundawat family from Burari, Delhi, India, in 2018. Ten people were found hanged, while the oldest family member, the grandmother, was strangled. The bodies were found on 1 July 2018; in the early morning after the death. The police have ruled the deaths were motivated by shared delusion or psychosis.

Background
The Chundawat family (also known as Bhatia family by neighbours) had been living in the two-storey house in Burari's Sant Nagar neighbourhood for around twenty years, after moving from their native town in Tohana, Haryana. The family ran a grocery shop and plywood business in the area. The family consisted of:
Narayani Devi (80), mother of Bhuvnesh, Lalit and Pratibha
Pratibha Bhatia (57), widowed daughter of Narayani Devi
Bhuvnesh (50), elder son of Narayani Devi
Lalit (45), younger son of Narayani Devi
Savita (48), elder daughter-in-law of Narayani Devi, wife of Bhuvnesh
Tina (42), younger daughter-in-law of Narayani Devi, wife of Lalit
Priyanka (33), daughter of Pratibha
Nitu (25), elder daughter of Bhuvnesh
Monu (called "Menaka") (23), younger daughter of Bhuvnesh
Dhruv (called "Dushyant") (15), only son and youngest child of Bhuvnesh
Shivam (15), son and only child of Lalit.

In 2007, Lalit Chundawat's father Bhopal Singh died of natural causes. After the death of their 
father, Lalit became very introverted. One day, he told his family that he was possessed by his father's soul, who advised him the ways to attain a good life. Since 2007 he had been maintaining a diary on his father's "instructions".

Discovery of bodies
On the morning of 1 July 2018 around 7:15 am, the neighbour Gurcharan Singh, who used to go on morning walks with one of the deceased, went to the Chundawat residence after noticing Lalit Chundawat's absence for the morning walk, as well as the fact that the Chundawat's shops were still not opened (the shops usually opened between 5 and 5:30 am). Gurcharan Singh found the door of the house open and the ten people, including Lalit Chundawat, hanging. He raised an alert by calling other neighbours, and police received the call around 7:30am.

Suicides
Ten of the eleven people – two men, six women and two teens – were found hanging in the courtyard of the house. They were blindfolded and their mouths were taped. Some of the bodies had their hands and feet tied as well. Another woman, 80-year-old Narayani Devi was found dead in another room. It appeared that she had been strangled.

Members of the family were found hanging from a mesh in their ceiling in the hallway, all close together. Their faces were wrapped almost entirely, ears plugged with cotton, mouths taped and hands tied behind the back. There were five stools, probably shared by the 10 members. Their faces were covered with cloth pieces cut from a single bed-sheet.

Tommy, the pet dog of the family, was the only survivor in the house. He was chained on the terrace and had a high fever when the police found him after discovering the 11 bodies. It was not clear who had tied him. He was later said to have been convalescing at Noida's House of Stray Animals, where he was taken immediately after being rescued.

Investigation
Evidence found in the house pointed to mass suicide for occult reasons, and Post-mortem examination of the bodies found no signs of struggle. Nevertheless, due to the public nature of the case, pressure from hardline groups, and accusations of coverup from relatives, Police initially recorded the case as a murder and investigated the possibility of a murder motivated by non-occult reasons.

Police found 11 diaries in the house, all of them maintained for the period of eleven years. Joint Commissioner of Police (Crime) Alok Kumar stated: "We have found handwritten notes detailing how hands and legs are to be tied and are quite similar to the manner in which the bodies of 10 persons were found. They are exhaustive notes and we are studying them." Details written in the diaries match how the bodies were found with their faces covered, mouths taped, and cotton balls in ears. The bodies were discovered hanged in batches of three, which is what the diaries also state. The diary stated that the Bebe (elderly woman) could not stand and hence should be laying on the bed, which was consistent with the discovery of her being found strangled on the bed. The diary also mentions: "everyone will tie their own hands and when the kriya (ritual) is done then everyone will help each other untie their hands", indicating that the family was not expecting to die.

Role of Lalit 
Handwriting analysis revealed that these diaries were written by Priyanka (daughter of Pratibha) and Nitu (elder daughter of Bhuvnesh), but were supposedly dictated to Lalit by his late father's spirit. Lalit is believed to have masterminded the incident. The crime branch believes that Lalit and his wife Tina were responsible for tying the hands and legs of the family members. Lalit had told the family members that the soul of the husband of Narayani Devi had entered his body in order to get the family to follow him.

Psychological view
According to psychologists, these sequence of events can be caused by 'shared psychotic disorder' because of which the members blindly follow the instructions of one among them. They propose that Lalit had a 'delusional disorder’. However, their elder brother, who stays in Rajasthan, believes that this was a well planned murder and not a suicide. Stating that if this whole thing was done by Lalit and his wife then their hands should be opened instead of tied.

In popular culture
The 845th episode of the Indian crime television show called Crime Patrol is based on the Burari deaths.

Three-part true crime docu-series titled House of Secrets: The Burari Deaths is based on the case. Created by Leena Yadav and Anubhav Chopra, the series premiered on Netflix on 8 October 2021.

See also
 Mass suicide
 Folie à deux

References

2018 in India
2018 suicides
2010s in Delhi
July 2018 events in India
June 2018 events in India
Mass suicides
Psychosis
Suicides in India